The Northern Media Group is a local radio group in Northern Ireland, owning six stations. The company was formed from a consortium which included The Irish News, River Media and the Alpha Newspaper Group and is based in Cookstown and Ballymena.

Portfolio
The six stations it owns include Q Network Radio which it purchased in summer 2006, while the other stations were launched by the company in 2005 and 2006. The company's stations are:
Q102.9 - Derry, Northern Ireland 
Q97.2 - Coleraine, Northern Ireland 
Q101.2 - Omagh/Enniskillen, Northern Ireland
Five FM - Newry, Northern Ireland
Six FM - Cookstown, Northern Ireland 
Seven FM - Ballymena, Northern Ireland.

Owners
Q Radio is owned by The Irish News.

Mass media companies of Northern Ireland
Radio broadcasting companies of the United Kingdom